Marathon is the eleventh studio album by Santana. This marked the beginning of the group's commercial slide, in spite of having the Top 40 hit "You Know That I Love You". Alex Ligertwood, who would sing with the group throughout the 1980s, joined the group for this album.

Track listing

Side one
 "Marathon" (Carlos Santana) - 1:28
 "Lightning in the Sky" (Santana, Chris Solberg) - 3:52
 "Aqua Marine" (Alan Pasqua, Santana) - 5:35
 "You Know That I Love You" (Alex Ligertwood, Pasqua, Santana) - 4:26
 "All I Ever Wanted" (Ligertwood, Santana, Solberg) – 4:02

Side two
 "Stand Up" (Santana, Solberg) - 4:02
 "Runnin" (David Margen) - 1:39
 "Summer Lady" (Ligertwood, Pasqua, Solberg) - 4:23
 "Love" (Santana, Solberg) - 3:22
 "Stay (Beside Me)" (Santana) - 3:50
 "Hard Times" (Ligertwood, Margen, Pasqua) - 3:57

Personnel
 Alex Ligertwood – lead vocals
 Carlos Santana – guitars, backing vocals
 Chris Solberg – guitars, keyboards, backing vocals
 Alan Pasqua – keyboards, backing vocals
 David Margen – bass
 Graham Lear – drums
 Armando Peraza – percussion (timbales), backing vocals
 Raul Rekow – percussion (congas), backing vocals

Charts

Certifications

References

Santana (band) albums
1979 albums
Albums produced by Keith Olsen
Albums produced by Carlos Santana
Columbia Records albums